"Love Story" is a song by American singer-songwriter Nadia Ali. It was released on March 10, 2009, as the second single from Ali's debut solo album, Embers, by Smile in Bed Records.

Track listing

Love Story: Remixes

Love Story: Les Remixes Noirs

Awards and nominations
2010 International Dance Music Awards at Winter Music Conference
Best Progressive/Tech House Track, Love Story (Nominated)

Charts

Weekly charts

Year-end charts

References

2009 singles
Nadia Ali (singer) songs
Songs written by Nadia Ali (singer)
2009 songs